Benji's Special Educational Academy Independent School District (or Benji's Academy Charter School) was a state charter school with two campuses (including Benji's II) in the Northside district of Houston, Texas, near the Fifth Ward. The school covered grades Pre-Kindergarten 4-12. The school initially defied an order to close from the Texas Education Agency (TEA). In 2011 it merged with Leader's Academy High School for Business and Academic Success into Victory Preparatory Academy.

History

The school was founded on May 8, 1981 by Theaola Robinson, who served as the executive director and founder of Benji's Academy. Her son, Benjajuain "Benjie" Chandler, was diagnosed with some brain damage at age three. According to Robinson, she became frustrated when she did not find any satisfactory schools that would help her son succeed. Therefore Robinson established the school. In November 1998 the school received a charter from the Texas Education Agency (TEA) to serve grades PreK through 12.

The TEA board, appointed by TEA commissioner Robert Scott, voted to close Benji's on Monday September 13, 2010 because, according to the board, Benji's was almost bankrupt. According to Debbie Ratliffe, a TEA spokesperson, Benji's had $800 in the bank, with $85,500 owed to the Internal Revenue Service (IRS), $350,000 owed to two banks, and additional debts owed to the Texas State Teacher's Retirement System. Robinson defied the state's order to close her school and continued operations. According to Houston City Council member Jarvis Johnson, 400 of the school's 500 students attended classes on Wednesday September 15, the day that the TEA's order took effect. The school demanded that the TEA release funds that, according to Benji's, were improperly withheld from the school. On Friday September 17 the school's bid for the release of the funds failed.

In 2011 Robinson sued KTRK-TV and its parent company, Disney, for libel.

In 2011 it merged with Leader's Academy High School for Business and Academic Success into Victory Preparatory Academy after Leader's Academy's board, Management Accountability Corp., took over Benji's School.

School song
Joe Willis wrote and arranged the school song. Cedric Taylor performed the school song.

See also

 List of state-operated charter schools in Houston

References

External links
 Benji's Academy Charter School (Archive)
 "Benji's Charter School." KIAH-TV
 Mellon, Ericka. "Fifth Ward charter school defies state order to close." Houston Chronicle. September 15, 2010.

Charter schools in Houston
Charter high schools in Houston
1981 establishments in Texas
Educational institutions established in 1981
2011 disestablishments in Texas
Educational institutions disestablished in 2011
Charter K-12 schools in Texas
Public K-12 schools in Houston